Michael A. Davis (born July 26, 1946) is a retired American basketball player in the National Basketball Association (NBA) and American Basketball Association (ABA).

Davis was selected by the Baltimore Bullets in the first round of the 1967 NBA draft and by the Oakland Oaks in the 1967 ABA Draft.

Named to the 1970 NBA All-Rookie Team, he played from 1969 to 1973 as a member of the Baltimore Bullets, Buffalo Braves, and Memphis Tams.

External links
NBA/ABA stats

1946 births
Living people
American men's basketball players
Baltimore Bullets (1963–1973) draft picks
Baltimore Bullets (1963–1973) players
Basketball players from New York City
Buffalo Braves players
Guards (basketball)
Memphis Tams players
Oakland Oaks draft picks
Sportspeople from Brooklyn
Virginia Union Panthers men's basketball players
Eastern District High School alumni